W. Clarke Wescoe (1920-2004) was an American medical educator, physician, pharmacologist and academic administrator. He was selected as the dean of the University of Kansas School of Medicine at the age of 32 and served in that capacity from 1952 to 1960. He was the 10th chancellor of the University of Kansas from 1960 to 1969, leading the University during a time of both campus growth with the near doubling in enrollment and unrest during the 1960s. More than $40 million in new construction was completed, including most of the Daisy Hill residence halls.

Background
W. Clarke Wescoe was born in Allentown, Pennsylvania on May 3, 1920 to Charles H. and Hattie G. Wescoe. He received his B.S. from Muhlenberg College in 1941 and his medical degree from the Cornell Medical College of Cornell University in 1944.

Career 
Wescoe was an intern and resident at New York Hospital–Cornell Medical Center. Prior to his in academic career, he was assigned to the War Department’s Army Specialized Training Program by the United States government and served the United States Army as a medical officer in the US Army’s Fitzsimons General Hospital in Aurora, Colorado in 1946, where he remained three months and was put in charge of the tuberculosis ward, which at the time was filled primarily by those American soldiers who’d survived the Bataan Death March and wartime Japanese internment in the Philippines. He was reassigned to the Army Chemical Center at Edgewood Arsenal, Maryland. His responsibilities at Edgewood Arsenal centered on biomedical research and the development of pharmacological treatments to various chemical and nerve agents. He was discharged from military in 1948.

Employment history
 Cornell University
1949–1951 Assistant Professor of Pharmacology at Cornell University Medical College. In 1949 he received the prestigious Markle Scholarship

 University of Kansas
1951–1952 Professor of Pharmacology and Experimental Medicine at the University of Kansas 
1952–1960 Dean of the University of Kansas School of Medicine
1960–1969 Chancellor of the University of Kansas

Sterling Drug, Inc
1969–1985 first as Vice President for Medical Affairs and Research, later rising to the position of Chairman of the Board and Chief Executive Officer

 Boards and committees
1985–2004 Board of Directors of the New York Stock Exchange as well as several academic, corporate, and foundation boards, and as a trustee of Columbia University and Cornell Medical School

References

External links
 

1920 births
2004 deaths
Muhlenberg College alumni
Weill Cornell Medical College alumni
Cornell University faculty
Chancellors of the University of Kansas
Leaders of the University of Kansas Medical Center
20th-century American academics